William Hayes (born 14 January 1968) is a Canadian diver. He competed in the men's 10 metre platform event at the 1992 Summer Olympics.

References

External links
 

1968 births
Living people
Canadian male divers
Olympic divers of Canada
Divers at the 1992 Summer Olympics
Divers from Toronto